Mount Bond is a mountain located in Grafton County, New Hampshire, United States. The mountain is named after Professor George P. Bond (1825–1865) of Harvard University, and is the southernmost extension of the Twin Range of the White Mountains.  Mount Bond is flanked to the north by Mount Guyot.

Mount Bond has two subsidiary peaks, West Bond and Bondcliff (or "The Cliffs"). All three peaks are included on the Appalachian Mountain Club's list of "four-thousand footers".

Mount Bond is located within the Pemigewasset Wilderness Area. 
It drains to the east and west into the North Fork and Franconia Branch respectively of the East Branch of the Pemigewasset River, thence into the Pemigewasset and Merrimack Rivers, and into the Gulf of Maine in Massachusetts.

See also

 List of mountains in New Hampshire
 White Mountain National Forest

References

External links

AMC: Mt. Bond
 hikethewhites.com: Mt. Bond

Mountains of New Hampshire
Mountains of Grafton County, New Hampshire
New England Four-thousand footers